Köksal Yedek (born 17 January 1985) is a Turkish footballer who plays as a winger for Nişantaşıspor.

References

External links

1985 births
People from Avanos
Living people
Turkish footballers
Association football midfielders
Zeytinburnuspor footballers
Kayserispor footballers
Şanlıurfaspor footballers
Kayseri Erciyesspor footballers
Karşıyaka S.K. footballers
Elazığspor footballers
Antalyaspor footballers
Gaziantep F.K. footballers
Kardemir Karabükspor footballers
Hatayspor footballers
Süper Lig players
TFF First League players
TFF Second League players